Ahmad Diriye, also known as Ahmad Umar and Abu Ubaidah, is the Boqor of Somalia’s Islamist group Al-Shabaab. He was listed by the U.S. State Department as a Specially Designated Global Terrorist in April 2015. The Rewards for Justice Program currently offers up to 10 million USD for information regarding him.

History
Ahmad Diriye was born in 1972 in El Buur, Somalia.

He is believed to be in his fifties and is a member of the Bajimaal section of the  Dir clan from the Kismayo region of Somalia.

Ahmad Diriye became the leader of al-Shabaab following the death of the group's former leader, Ahmed Abdi Godane, in September 2014. Prior to replacing Godane, Diriye served in several positions within al-Shabaab, including as Godane's assistant, the deputy governor of Lower Juba region in 2008, and al-Shabaab's governor of Bay and Bakool regions in 2009. By 2013, he was a senior adviser to Godane and served in al-Shabaab's "Interior Department," where he oversaw the group's domestic activity. He shares Godane's vision for al-Shabaab's terrorist attacks in Somalia as an element of al-Qa’ida's greater global aspirations.

He was named Al-Shabaab leader in September 2014, after Godane was killed by a U.S. airstrike.

See also
List of fugitives from justice who disappeared

References

1972 births
Al-Shabaab (militant group) members
Al-Qaeda leaders
Leaders of Islamic terror groups
Living people
People of the Somali Civil War
Somalian al-Qaeda members
Somalian Muslims
Fugitives
Individuals designated as terrorists by the United States government